Balchão or balichow is an Indian dish (more specifically Goan and Malvani) consisting of fresh fried prawns in a spicy and vinegary sauce.

Ingredients
Balchão is a method of cooking, made with either fish (de peixe), prawns (de camarão), or pork (de porco), in a spicy and sour tomato-chili sauce. It resembles pickling and can be made days in advance without reheating. Some Goans make prawn balchao in tamarind sauce.

Traditional balchão uses a paste made from dried shrimp known as galmbo in Konkani.

Its ingredients could include prawns, oil, onions chopped fine, tomatoes, garlic paste or cloves, ginger paste or ginger, dried red chillies, cumin seed,  mustard seeds, cinnamon, cloves, sugar, vinegar and salt.

Preparation
The prawns are cleaned and deveined then salted and set aside. The spices are roasted and cooled. Ginger, garlic and roasted spices are ground into a paste with the vinegar.  Oil is heated, the prawns are added and fried until opaque. Next, the pan is used to fry onions. Once onions are light brown, tomatoes are added and fried till soft.  Spice-vinegar paste is added, with sugar and salt. This is fried until the oil begins to separate from the masala, prawns are added, and the combination is cooked a few more minutes.

Balchão is usually served with plain hot boiled rice. It keeps well under refrigeration.

History
Balchão was introduced to India by the Portuguese during Portuguese Goa, most likely from Malacca (today Melaka).

Preparation
Catholic homes may use coconut vinegar for its acidic sharpness, while Hindu families may use cane vinegar to make it milder. It is now common to use white vinegar or malt vinegar.

See also 
 Balichão, a related dish in Macau
 Indian cuisine
 List of pork dishes
 List of seafood dishes

References 

Goan cuisine
Indian cuisine
Indian fusion cuisine
Pork dishes
Portuguese fusion cuisine
Seafood dishes
Tomato sauces